The province of Quirino has 132 barangays comprising its 6 towns.

Barangays

References

Populated places in Quirino
Quirino